The table of years in anime is a tabular display of all years in anime, for overview and quick navigation to any year.

1900s in anime
pre-1917 1917–1938 1939–1945 1946–1959

1960 1961 1962 1963 1964 1965 1966 1967 1968 1969

1970 1971 1972 1973 1974 1975 1976 1977 1978 1979

1980 1981 1982 1983 1984 1985 1986 1987 1988 1989

1990 1991 1992 1993 1994 1995 1996 1997 1998 1999

2000s in anime
2000 2001 2002 2003 2004 2005 2006 2007 2008 2009

2010 2011 2012 2013 2014 2015 2016 2017 2018 2019

2020 2021 2022 2023

 
Anime